St Michael and All Angels Church may refer to:

Africa
 St Michael and All Angels Church, Blantyre Malawi
 St. Michael and All Angels' Anglican Church, Weltevreden Park, Johannesburg, South Africa

America
 Cathedral Church of Saint Michael and All Angels, Bridgetown, Barbados
 St. Michael and All Angels Episcopal Church (Anniston, Alabama), U.S.
 St. Michael and All Angels Episcopal Church, formerly Grace Church (Cincinnati, Ohio), U.S.

Asia
 St. Michael's and All Angels' Church, Oorgaum, KGF, India
 St Michael and All Angels Church, Polwatte, Colombo, Sri Lanka
 Regal Parish and National Shrine of Saint Michael and the Archangels, Manila, Philippines

Europe

Ireland
 Church of St Michael and All Angels, Millicent, County Kildare

United Kingdom

England
 St Michael and All Angels Church, Aston Clinton, Buckinghamshire
 St Michael and All Angels Church, Hughenden, Buckinghamshire
 St Michael and All Angels' Church, Thornton, Buckinghamshire
 St Michael and All Angels Church, Caldecote, South Cambridgeshire
 St Michael and All Angels Church, Little Leigh, Cheshire
 St Michael and All Angels Church, Macclesfield, Cheshire
 St Michael and All Angels Church, Marbury, Cheshire
 St Michael and All Angels, Middlewich, Cheshire
 St Michael and All Angels Church, Crewe Green, Cheshire
 St Michael and All Angels Church, Bude, Cornwall
 St Michael and All Angels Church, Latchley, Cornwall
 St Michael and All Angels Church, Penwerris, Cornwall
St Michael and All Angels' Church, Hathersage, Derbyshire
 St Michael and All Angels Church, Hawkshead, Cumbria
 St Michael and All Angels Church, Mount Dinham, Exeter, Devon
St Michael and All Angels' Church, Heavitree, Exeter, Devon
St Michael and All Angels Church, Littlebredy, Dorset
 St Michael and All Angels Church, Brighton, East Sussex
 St Michael and All Angels Church, Galleywood Common, Essex, a church designed by James Piers St Aubyn
 St Michael's and All Angels Church, Guiting Power, Gloucestershire
 St Michael and All Angels' Church, Ashton-under-Lyne, Greater Manchester
 St Michael and All Angels' Church, Howe Bridge, Greater Manchester
 St Michael and All Angels Church, Mottram, Greater Manchester
 Church of St Michael and All Angels, Northenden, Greater Manchester
 St Michael and All Angels Church, Lyndhurst, Hampshire
 Belmont Abbey, Herefordshire, Abbey Church of St Michael and All Angels, Hereford, Herefordshire
 Church of St Michael and All Angels, Ledbury, Herefordshire
 St Michael and All Angels Church, Moccas, Herefordshire 
 Church of St Michael and All Angels, Swanmore, Ryde, Isle of Wight
 St Michael and All Angels Church, Maidstone, Kent
 St Michael and All Angels Church, Altcar, Lancashire
 St Michael and All Angels Church, Ashton-on-Ribble, Preston, Lancashire
 St Michael and All Angels Church, Headingley, Leeds
 St Michael and All Angels Church, Edmondthorpe, Leicestershire
 St Michael and All Angels Church, Barnes, London
 St Michael and All Angels, Bedford Park, London
 St Michael & All Angels, Enfield, London
 St Michael and All Angels Church, Wood Green, London
 Church of St Michael and All Angels, Braydeston, Norfolk
 St Michael and All Angels Church, Creaton, Northamptonshire
 Church of St Michael and All Angels, Felton, Northumberland
 St Michael and All Angels Church (Howick, Northumberland)
 Church of St Michael and All Angels, Averham, Nottinghamshire
 Church of St Michael and All Angels, Bramcote, Nottinghamshire
 St Michael and All Angels' Church, Elton on the Hill, Nottinghamshire
 Church of St Michael and All Angels, Underwood, Nottinghamshire
 Church of St Michael and All Angels, Beckwithshaw, North Yorkshire
 St. Michael & All Angels, Chetwynd, Shropshire
 St Michael and All Angels' Church, Welshampton, Shropshire
 Church of St Michael & All Angels, Greinton, Somerset
 Church of St Michael and All Angels, Puriton, Somerset
 Church of St Michael and All Angels, Somerton, Somerset
 St Michael and All Angels Church, Bassett, Southampton
 St Michael and All Angels Church, Great Houghton, South Yorkshire
 Church of St Michael and All Angels, Hamstall Ridware, Staffordshire
 St Michael and All Angels, Woolverstone, Suffolk
 St Michael and All Angels' Church, Houghton-le-Spring, Tyne and Wear
 St Michael and All Angels Church, Brownsover, Warwickshire
 St Michael & All Angels Church, Wood End, Warwickshire
 St Michael and All Angels' Church, Bartley Green, Birmingham, West Midlands
St Michael & All Angels Church, Pelsall, West Midlands
 St Michael and All Angels Church, Lowfield Heath, Crawley, West Sussex
 St Michael and All Angels Church, Southwick, West Sussex
 St Michael and All Angels' Church, Haworth, West Yorkshire
 St Michael's and All Angels Church, Thornhill, West Yorkshire
 St Michael and All Angels, Broadway, Worcestershire
 St Michael and All Angels' Church, Cofton Hackett, Worcestershire
 St Michael and All Angels, Great Witley, Worcestershire
 Church of St Michael and All Angels, Martin Hussingtree, Worcestershire
St Michael and All Angels Church, Spennithorne, North Yorkshire

Scotland
 St Michael & All Angels, Inverness

Wales
 Church of St Michael and All Angels, Forden, Powys
 Church of St Michael and All Angels, Gwernesney, Monmouthshire
 St Michael and All Angels Church, Llanfihangel Rogiet, Monmouthshire
 St Michael and All Angels, Mitchel Troy, Monmouthshire

Oceania 
 Church of St Michael and All Angels, Christchurch, New Zealand

See also
 Michaelion, a sanctuary dedicated to Archangel Michael